Melanie Jade 'Mel' Morton is a fictional character from the British ITV soap opera Coronation Street. The character was portrayed by Emma Edmondson from the character's inception into the episode airing on 18 March 2007 until her departure on 3 October 2008.

Storylines
Some of the character's earlier minor storylines involved David Platt developing a crush on Mel, but she stood him up. To get his revenge, he spread gossip that he had slept with Mel, but was forced to apologise by his mother.

In February 2008, Mel became WPC Morton, joining her friend Abi Sharpe in the police force where she began training to become a full-time Police Constable. At the time, the storyline also saw her onscreen grandfather put his obituary into the local paper, thinking that Mel's chances of joining the police force would be improved if the local police thought he was no longer alive to get involved in dodgy dealings.

Mel later argued with her mother Teresa Bryant upon her return in May 2008, portraying the rocky relationship between mother and daughter. After Mel returned from holiday in August 2008, she discovered that Teresa had been lying in a deliberate attempt to lengthen her stay in the house. This prompted Mel to make her father choose between herself and her mother. When Jerry chose her mother, she went to stay at Abi's.

It was later announced that the character of Mel would be involved in a controversial storyline that would depict the violence that is currently on the streets of Britain. More so, that the storyline reflected an attack that happened in Rochdale when thugs booted an unconscious man in the head. In the soap opera, the latter was depicted happening to fellow character Abi Sharpe, who came to Mel's assistance during the fight.

The episode was screened on 3 September 2008. Mel and Abi went out on the town to celebrate the end of their police training. Outside the bar, they witnessed a gang of girls fighting on the street. Abi called the police and told Mel to stay out of it as they were both off duty but she intervened. Upon seeing her friend being punched and kicked by the girls, Abi attempted to break up the fight but sustained a blow to the head from a glass bottle and received blows to the head after being stamped on. The attackers could not be charged due to lack of evidence, seeing Mel trying to take the law into her own hands.
Later in the week, Mel tried to seek revenge on the girls but instead she was confronted by Teresa and they reconciled. Later, she got the revenge she needed as Teresa went behind her back and followed one of the girls into the ladies toilets in the bar where the attack happened. Teresa gave her a blow to the head with a heel of her shoe. Teresa and Mel later fell out yet again after Mel discovered Teresa's scheme and arrested Teresa for attempted murder. Mel was furious when Jerry refused to back up her story, which not only freed Teresa, but damaged Mel's reputation on the force.

Jerry, Kayleigh and Finlay left the street on 29 September for Spain; however, Mel didn't want to go as she had only just qualified in police force. She departed on 3 October when she saw Darryl bringing a drunken Teresa back to the house. Unable to cope with the situation, she left to stay with Abi.

Creation and development

Casting
During the casting for the character of Mel Morton different actresses were called in for auditions for the role. Actress Emma Edmondson revealed in an interview with Digital Spy that she kept being called back into each stage of auditioning where hopefuls had to audition as sets of twins. Emma constantly met fellow actor Jonathan Dixon who plays her onscreen brother Darryl Morton. In the final audition, the two were paired up and went on to be cast as twins Mel and Darryl.

Background
Mel was the more responsible member of her roguish family, and ITV described her as 'gobby, serious-minded but sensible.' During Emma Edmondson's interview with the media website Digital Spy she said the same of her character's personality:

Departure
On 26 April 2008 it was announced that the character of Mel, along with most of the Morton family, was axed by new producer Kim Crowther, but the character would play some dramatic plots to fill the storyline arc before leaving.

Reception 
Ian Wylie of Manchester Evening News said upon the axing of the Morton clan he had become to like the character, even though she and her onscreen family 'failed to fit the Weatherfield jigsaw'.
Various blog sites ran polls to get the public's opinion over who was the best character in the Morton clan, Corrie Blog writer stated that Mel was the character with most potential comparing her to former teenage characters Katy Harris, Lucille Hewitt and Jenny Bradley. The review centre said that Mel and her family were full of wooden actors.

References 

Coronation Street characters
Fictional British police officers
Fictional twins
Television characters introduced in 2007
Female characters in television